Marina Arnoldovna Khlebnikova (born November 6, 1965, Dolgoprudny) is a Russian singer and actress, winner of a  Jurmala Young Pop Singer Competition (1991), Golden Gramophone Award, Pesnya goda (both 1997),  and Merited Artist of the Russian Federation (2004).

Discography 
Studio albums
 Stay (1995)
 Bili Bohm (1996)
 Cup of Сoffee (1997)
 Photo Аlbum (1999)
 My Sun, Get Up!  (2001)
 Cats of My Soul  (2005)
  Life (2021)
Concert albums
 Live Collection (1998, reissued in 2001)
 Live! (1999)

Personal life
First husband   Anton Loginov  committed suicide in 2018. Her second husband became is businessman Mikhail  Maidanich (born May 15, 1969). Daughter Dominika  Khlebnikova (born in 1999). Marina  сollects stuffed animals and minerals.

References

External links

Official website 
 
 

1965 births
Living people
Soviet pop singers
Russian pop singers
Honored Artists of the Russian Federation
People from Dolgoprudny
Winners of the Golden Gramophone Award
Gnessin State Musical College alumni
Russian television presenters
Russian radio personalities
Soviet pianists
Russian women pianists
Soviet women composers
Russian women composers
20th-century Russian singers
21st-century Russian singers
20th-century Russian women singers
21st-century Russian women singers
20th-century women composers
Women jazz pianists
Russian film actresses
Russian television actresses
20th-century Russian actresses
21st-century Russian actresses
20th-century women pianists
21st-century women pianists